Navigobius is a genus of fish in the family Microdesmidae native to the Indo-Pacific Ocean.

Species
There are currently 3 recognized species in this genus:
 Navigobius dewa Hoese & Motomura, 2009
 Navigobius khanhoa Prokofiev, 2016 
 Navigobius vittatus G. R. Allen, Erdmann & Cahyani, 2015 (Brunei dartfish)

References

Marine fish genera
Microdesmidae